Hotopha Creek is a stream in the U.S. state of Mississippi. It is a tributary to the Tallahatchie River.

Hotopha is a name derived from the Choctaw language purported to mean "grasshopper". A variant transliteration is "Hotipka Creek"

References

Rivers of Mississippi
Rivers of Panola County, Mississippi
Mississippi placenames of Native American origin